The men's 1000 metres race of the 2013–14 ISU Speed Skating World Cup 1, arranged in the Olympic Oval, in Calgary, Alberta, Canada, was held on 9 November 2013.

Shani Davis of the United States won, while Kjeld Nuis of the Netherlands came second, and Brian Hansen of the United States came third. Yevgeny Lalenkov of Russia won Division B.

Results
The race took place on Saturday, 9 November, with Division A scheduled in the morning session, at 11:30, and Division B scheduled in the afternoon session, at 16:18.

Division A

Division B

References

Men 1000
1